The Rødvig Formation is a geological formation deposited during the earliest part of the Danian (early Paleocene) and it was first identified by Richard Taylor and Richard Phillips in 1827. It is known from exposures at Stevns Klint in Denmark. The unit lies directly above the K–Pg boundary and contains fossils that provide a record of the recovery of various groups following the Cretaceous–Paleogene extinction. The upper boundary of the formation is an unconformity in the form of a hardground, beneath which the formation is sometimes missing. The base of the unit is irregular due to the presence of mounding associated with bryozoa, causing variations in thickness. The unit is subdivided into the lower Fiskeler Member mainly formed of marl and the overlying Cerithium Limestone Member.

Geology 

The  is enriched in iridium, a fact used as an argument for the Alvarez hypothesis that the worldwide Cretaceous–Paleogene mass extinction was caused by the impact of an asteroid. Following the boundary is a layer of darker clay and chalk between 10 and 30 cm thick, corresponding to a period of low biological diversity on the sea floor immediately after the K-Pg Boundary.

Paleontology 

The Rødvig Formation contains a remarkably detailed and complete fossil record of the biota in Northern Europe during the early Paleogene. The layers are rich in microfossils, containing many species of millimeter-long suspension feeders. A wide variety of benthic foraminifera species have been identified from the Rødvig Formation, with significant differences in abundance across the K–Pg boundary demonstrating the biotic turnover that occurred during the mass extinction event.

Ammonites 

The Rødvig Formation was the first known site to document the short-term survival of ammonites into the Paleogene, when they were originally thought to have gone extinct at the K-Pg boundary. Ammonites are thus only known from the first 200,000 years of the Cerithium Limestone, before disappearing from the formation around 64.8 million years ago.

Two ammonite species are known from the Rødvig Formation: Baculites vertebralis, notable for having a nearly straight shell, and Hoploscaphites constrictus, which may have been a subspecies of Scaphites, and is also the most common ammonite known from the Paleocene.

Known fossil fauna 
The known fossil fauna found in the Rødvig Formation includes:
 Acar sp.
 Arcida indet.
 Arcopsis christinae
 Arcopsis sp.
 Baculites vertebralis
 Barbatia sp.
 Bathyarca sp.
 Bivalvia indet.
 Brachidontes sp.
 Carcharias aff. gracilis
 Centroscymnus praecursor
 Chlamydoselachus sp.
 Cuspidaria (Halonympha) kanae
 Corbulamella sp.
 Crassatella sp.
 Crassescyliorhinus germanicus
 Cretalamna sp.
 Cuspidaria sp.
 Cyclaster danicus
 Cyrtodaria sp.
 Dacrydium sp.
 Echinorhinus sp.
 Eriphylopsis sp.
 Euciroa sp.
 Hemiscyllium hermani
 Heterodontus rugosus
 Hoploscaphites constrictus
 Gregariella sp.
 Leptosolen sp.
 Limopsis ravni
 Limopsis sp.
 Loripes sp.
 Lucinidae indet.
 Martesia sp.
 Miocardiopsis sp.
 Myrtea sp.
 Nebrius sp.
 Nielonella sp.
 Palaeocypraea spirata
 Palaeogaleus cf. faujasi
 Palaeohypotodus aff. bronni
 Parasquatina cappettai
 Paratriakis curtirostris
 Portlandia arctica
 Protocardia sp.
 Pycnodonte vesicularis (=Phygraea vesiculare)
 “Scyliorhinus” biddlei
 “Scyliorhinus” elongatus
 Spondylus fimbriatus
 Squalus gabrielsoni
 Syncylonema nilsoni
 Synechodus faxensis (=Paleospinax)
 Thalassinoides sp.
 Thyasira sp.
 Tylocidaris oedumi
 Uddenia sp.
 Unicordium sp,
 Vetericardiella sp.
 Yoldiella sp.

References 

Danian
Danian Stage
Geology of Denmark